Kapsch CarrierCom is a global system integrator and supplier of end-to-end telecommunications solutions for public and railway operators, urban transport organizations and companies seeking real-time asset management solutions. The company generated a total revenue of €170,2 million as of March 2014 with 740 employees worldwide. The headquarters are located in Vienna, Austria and has subsidiaries in more than 20 countries around the globe. The management board consists of Kari Kapsch (CEO), Thomas Schöpf (COO) and Michael Kleinhagauer (CTO).

Milestones 

1982: Kapsch CarrierCom is established as Austria Telecommunication by Kapsch and Schrack and becomes a leading supplier for telecommunication solutions.
1989: Kapsch opens up new subsidiaries in the Czech Republic, Hungary, Poland and Slovakia, among others.
1995: Kapsch purchases Ericsson-Schrack’s fifty percent stake of Austria Telecommunication.
2002: Austria Telecommunication is renamed Kapsch CarrierCom and becomes part of the Kapsch Group.
2005 – 2008: Establishment of subsidiaries in Croatia, Bulgaria, Serbia, Slovenia, Belarus and Macedonia.
2009: Expansion through acquisitions of TIS Kis d.o.o. and Ring Datacom d.o.o. in Croatia.
2010: Acquisition of parts of the Carrier Networks Division of Nortel including the GSM technology for EMEA and Taiwan and the GSM-R technology for the global market.
2011: Kapsch CarrierCom executes the first GSM-R call in Africa over a 1,000 km distance and migrates a major telecom provider’s fixed network to next-generation VoIP technology.
2012: More than 70,000 track-kilometers are covered with Kapsch CarrierCom‘s GSM-R technology.

Business segments 

Kapsch CarrierCom offers solutions for four different business segments:

Kapsch Group 

Kapsch CarrierCom is part of the Kapsch Group, which is split into three business areas:
Kapsch CarrierCom:  Global system integrator and supplier of end-to-end telco solutions for public and railway operators, urban transport and companies seeking real-time asset management solutions.
Kapsch TrafficCom:   International supplier of technology, solutions and services for the Intelligent Transportation Systems (ITS) market.
Kapsch BusinessCom: System integrator for state-of-the-art telecom and network enterprise solutions, as well as provider of IT solutions.

References 

Technology companies of Austria
Technology companies established in 1982
Austrian companies established in 1982